Tofo Beach (pt: Praia do Tofo) or simply Tofo is a small town in southeastern Mozambique.  The town lies on the Indian Ocean coast, on Barra Beach peninsula in Inhambane Province, Jangamo District, 22 km drive from Inhambane city. A major Mozambican tourist destination, Tofo is a home to culture and sealife, with tourists drawn by a long Indian Ocean beach front and nightlife with amazing artists international or locals, Tofo is a hotspot for tourists from around the world to come and see the culture and sealife.

Tourist center
Historically a small coastal fishing village, Tofo has grown into an international tourism center. There is a small vegetable and African market, 4 diving centers, a small hotel, and several lodges offering various types of accommodation, from backpackers to 5 star luxury. There are also horse riding stables and many bars and restaurants. The tourist center also includes the nearby settlement known as Tofinho ("Little Tofo"), a 10-minute drive out of town with scenic views.

Tofo's tourist industry is built around its exceptional opportunities to see manta rays and whale sharks which are permanently resident in these waters. Diving centers run snorkeling trips to swim with the whale sharks and diving trips to see the manta rays (these dives are below 20 metres). Tofo is not otherwise a good location for those who wish to snorkel to see coral reefs and fish as these are too deep. A resident ecological center for local sea life has been created by hotels to manage and guide responsible tourism. Tofo Beach, running from a rocky point in the south up much of the length of Barra Beach attracts surfers and bathers.  Along the coast are a number of other small tourist centers, including Bazaruto Archipelago to the north, Praia de Zavala, Praia de Zavora, Baia dos Cocos, Barra Beach and Pomene. School holiday periods tend to be busy with many South Africans and others visiting Tofo during this time.

Transport
Inhambane Airport is operational Monday to Friday from 07:00 to 17:00, Saturdays from 08:00 to 17:00, open by advance request on Sundays.  Customs and Immigration can be organised in advance of arrivals.  Fees and taxes apply.

Direct flights to Inhambane from Johannesburg have enabled this industry. Otherwise Tofo is about 6 hours drive north of Maputo. From the north, Tofo is about 5 hours drive from Vilankulo.

See also
 Inhambane

References

External links

 Website

Populated places in Inhambane Province
Tourism in Mozambique